George Kenneth Griffey may refer to:

George Kenneth Griffey Sr. or Ken Griffey Sr. (born 1950), American former baseball player and coach
George Kenneth Griffey Jr. or Ken Griffey Jr. (born 1969), American former baseball player inducted into the Baseball Hall of Fame
George Kenneth Griffey III or Trey Griffey (born 1994), American football player